= Casteless =

Casteless may refer to:

- of an individual, an outcaste
- of a society, an egalitarian society without caste structure
